The 2008 Indiana Republican presidential primary took place on May 6, 2008. 27 delegates to the 2008 Republican National Convention were selected in the election. 

In addition, 27 other delegates were selected during the state convention from June 9 to June 10, 2008.

John McCain was the winner of the election and of all of Indiana's delegates.

Polling
No polling was conducted in Indiana for the Republican primary because John McCain was the Republican Party's presumptive nominee.

Campaigning
Unlike on the Democratic side, little campaigning took place as John McCain had already clinched the nomination. Ron Paul made only a few stops in the state, including Indiana University-Purdue University Fort Wayne a day before the primary.

Results

See also
 2008 Indiana Democratic presidential primary
 2008 Republican Party presidential primaries

References

Indiana
Republican
Indiana Republican primaries